Agony (U.S. theatrical/DVD title Rasputin) is a 1981 Soviet biographical film by Elem Klimov, made c.1973-75 and released in Western and Central Europe in 1982 (United States and Soviet Union 1985), after protracted resistance from Soviet authorities. The film is notable for its rich, sometimes baroque style, its sumptuous recreation of episodes from the final year of Imperial Russia and the psychological portraits of Grigori Rasputin and the Imperial family.

Plot
The storyline follows the final months of 1916 up to the murder of Rasputin; some events have been telescoped into this time though they actually happened earlier, during the war. Rasputin's effect on people around him is shown as almost hypnotic, and the film avoids taking a moral stance towards him—breaking not only with Soviet history but also with how he was regarded by people near the court at the time, some of whom regarded him as a debilitating figure who disgraced the monarchy and hampered the war effort.

Cast
 Aleksei Petrenko as Grigori Rasputin
 Anatoli Romashin as emperor Nicholas II
 Velta Līne as empress Alexandra Feodorovna
 Alisa Freindlich as Anna Vyrubova
 Aleksandr Romantsov as Felix Yusupov
 Yuri Katin-Yartsev as Vladimir Purishkevich
 Leonid Bronevoy as Ivan Manasevich-Manuilov
 Pavel Pankov as Manus
 Mickhail Danilov as Mikhail M. Andronikov
 Mikhail Svetin as Terekhov
 Boris Romanov as Balashov
 Lyudmila Polyakova as Praskovya Fyodorovna, Rasputin's wife
 Afanasi Trishkin as Maklakov

Release
The film went unshown until 1981, when it was screened at the Moscow Film Festival and attracted very favourable reviews. Released in Western Europe, Czechoslovakia, Hungary, Poland in 1982, it was hailed as one of the most original Soviet films of the 1970s. It was screened later in 1985, at the dawn of the Glasnost era.

The versions released in the 1980s, and later on DVD, differ somewhat in length and the final voice-over newsreel shots of the 1917 revolution may have been added in to appease authorities. The original mid-1970s cut does not seem to have survived, and it is unclear how much was rewritten or possibly reshot after 1975.

Alternate versions
At least four versions of the film exist, from 73 minutes, 104 minutes, 142 minutes (the North American DVD release from Kino International) and 151 minutes (the 1982 international release).

References

External links
 
 Watch Agony online at official Mosfilm site (with English subtitles)

Soviet biographical drama films
Russian biographical drama films
1980s biographical drama films
1975 films
1981 films
Films directed by Elem Klimov
Films scored by Alfred Schnittke
1980s Russian-language films
Mosfilm films
Films set in the 19th century
1980s historical drama films
Soviet historical drama films
Russian historical drama films
Films about Grigori Rasputin
1981 drama films